Carlos Eugenio Vides Casanova (born 1937) is the former head of the Salvadoran national guard between the years 1979 and 1983 and later served as the nation's Minister of Defense between 1983 and 1989.

In 1984, four national guardsmen who had once served under Vides Casanova's command-Daniel Canales Ramírez, Carlos Joaquín Contreras Palacios, Francisco Orlando Contreras Recinos and José Roberto Moreno Canjura—were convicted of murdering of the churchwomen and were sentenced to 30 years in prison. Their superior, sub-sergeant Luis Antonio Colindres Alemán, was also convicted for the murders as well.

In 1998, the four assassins confessed to abducting, raping and murdering the four churchwomen and claimed that they did so because Alemân had informed them that they had to act on orders from high-level military officers.  Some were then released from prison after detailing how Vides and his cousin Col. Óscar Edgardo Casanova Vejar, the local military commander in Zacatecoluca, had planned and orchestrated the executions of the churchwomen. A 16-year legal battle to deport General Vides Casanova soon commenced.

Emigration to the United States
Following his retirement, General Vides left El Salvador and moved to Florida in 1989 as a legal permanent resident and had been living in Palm Coast.

After his first wife died, Vides married Lourdes Llach, daughter of coffee baron, amateur astronomer, and former Salvadoran ambassador to the Holy See (1977–1991) Prudencio Llach Schonenberg.

Lawsuit cases
He was sued in the federal civil court of Miami, Florida in the United States in two precedent-setting cases.  The cases are referred to by the surname of his co-defendant, José Guillermo García:
 Ford v. Garcia, a lawsuit by the families of four Catholic churchwomen who were abducted, raped and murdered by a Salvadoran military death squad on December 2, 1980.  The defense won the case, and the families appealed.  Their appeal was denied, and in 2003, the United States Supreme Court refused to hear further proceedings.
 Ramagoza v. Garcia, a lawsuit by survivors of torture during the Salvadoran Civil War, including Carlos Mauricio and Neris Gonzalez.  Garcia and Vides lost, and a judgment of over $54 million (U.S.) was entered against them, and upheld on appeal.

Deportation to El Salvador
On October 6, 2009 the U.S. Department of Homeland Security announced that it initiated deportation proceedings against General Vides Casanova for assisting in the torture of Salvadoran civilians. On 24 February 2012, a Federal immigration judge cleared the way for his deportation.

On March 11, 2015, the Board of Immigration Appeals dismissed General Vides Casanova's appeal.
On April 8, 2015, U.S. immigration officials deported General Vides Casanova to El Salvador.
The lawsuit filed against Vides Casanova and General García was featured in the 2018 film "The Path of the Shadows".

See also
 Juan Romagoza Arce
 José Guillermo García
 Western Hemisphere Institute for Security Cooperation
 Salvadoran Civil War

References

External links
 "The Path of The Shadows" Film
Ford v. Garcia Trial Background. Legal history section of PBS website on "Justice and the Generals" presentation in 2002; accessed October 7, 2005; confirmed online December 11, 2006.
 Profile

Salvadoran military personnel
1937 births
People from Santa Ana, El Salvador
Living people
People of the Salvadoran Civil War
Government ministers of El Salvador
People from Palm Coast, Florida
1980 murders of U.S. missionaries in El Salvador
Defence ministers of El Salvador